KDEP (105.5 FM, "Coast 105.5") is a radio station licensed to Garibaldi, Oregon, United States.  The station is currently owned by Alexandra Communications.

References

External links

DEP
Mainstream adult contemporary radio stations in the United States
Radio stations established in 2001
2001 establishments in Oregon